Jennifer Irina Arveláez Padrin (born 28 October 1982) is a retired Venezuelan athlete who competed in the long jump and triple jump. She won multiple medals on regional level.

Her personal bests are 6.03 metres (Ponce 2006) in the long jump and 13.76 metres in the triple jump (Barinas 2007).

Competition record

References

1982 births
Living people
Venezuelan female long jumpers
Venezuelan female triple jumpers
Central American and Caribbean Games bronze medalists for Venezuela
Competitors at the 2002 Central American and Caribbean Games
Competitors at the 2006 Central American and Caribbean Games
Central American and Caribbean Games medalists in athletics
20th-century Venezuelan women
21st-century Venezuelan women